The 25-pair color code, originally known as even-count color code, is a color code used to identify individual conductors in twisted-pair wiring for telecommunications.

Color coding
With the development of new generations of telecommunication cables with polyethylene-insulated conductors (PIC) by Bell Laboratories for the Bell System in the 1950s, new methods were developed to mark each individual conductor in cables. Each wire is identified by the combination of two colors, one of which is the major color, and the second the minor color.  Major and minor colors are chosen from two different groups of five, resulting in 25 color combinations. The color combinations are applied to the insulation that covers each conductor. Typically, one color is a prominent background color of the insulation, and the other is a tracer, consisting of stripes, rings, or dots, applied over the background. The background color always matches the tracer color of its paired conductor, and vice versa.

The major, or primary group of colors consists of the sequence of white, red, black, yellow, and violet (mnemonics Why Run Backwards, You'll Vomit). The minor, or secondary color is chosen from the sequence blue, orange, green, brown, and slate (mnemonics Bell Operators Give Better Service).

The wire pairs are referenced directly by their color combination, or by the pair number. For example, pair 9 is also called the red-brown pair. In technical tabulations, the colors are often suitably abbreviated.

Violet is the standard name in the telecommunications and electronics industry, but it is sometimes referred to as purple. Similarly, slate is a particular shade of gray. The names of most of the colors were taken from the conventional colors of the rainbow or optical spectrum, and in the electronic color code, which uses the same ten colors, albeit in a different order.

When used for plain old telephone service (POTS), the first wire is known as the tip or A-leg (U.K.) conductor, and is usually connected to the positive side of a direct current (DC) circuit, while the second wire is known as the ring lead or B-leg (U.K.), and is connected to the negative side of the circuit. Neither of these two sides of the line has a connection to the local ground. This creates a balanced audio circuit with common-mode rejection, also known as a differential pair. The tip and ring convention is based on the ″ (6.5 mm) TRS phone connectors, which were employed in telephone switchboards in the 19th and 20th centuries, where the tip contact of the connector is separated from the ring contact by a spacer of insulation. The connection furthest from the cable is known as the tip, the middle connection is the ring, and the (largest) connection closest to the wire is the sleeve.

Older Bell System wiring inside customer premises used 4-conductor untwisted wire cable.  The 4 conductors were solid red, green, yellow & black wires.  They match to the current 25-color code as follows:

25-pair telco cable pinout
A common application of the 25-pair color code is the cabling for the Registered Jack interface RJ21, which uses a female 50-pin miniature ribbon connector, as shown in the following table. The geometry of the pins of the receptacle (right hand image) corresponds to the pin numbers of the table.  The left column of pins are the ring (R) conductors, while all tip (T) conductors are on the right.

Larger cables 
For cables with more than 25 pairs, each group of 25 is called a binder group.  The binder groups are marked with mylar ribbons using the same color coding system, starting with a white/blue ribbon, then a white/orange ribbon, and so on. The 24th binder group has a violet/brown ribbon, completing a super binder of 600 pairs.

In cables of more than 600 pairs, each of the 600-pair super binder group bundles is wrapped with a mylar binder ribbon, or string, matching the "tip" colors of the color code, starting with white. The pattern then starts over with the first 25-pair group as white/blue, and continues indefinitely, in multiples of 600 pairs or parts thereof. For example, a 900-pair cable has the first 600 pairs in 24 groups of 25 pairs in a white binder, and the remaining 300 pairs in 12 groups of 25 pairs wrapped in a red binder.

Some cables are "mirrored" or "clocked" with a pattern that is known throughout the telephone industry.  Starting with the first binder group in the center, the technician counts the cable's groups in a spiral direction depending on the location of the central office or switch.  If looking at the cable's core and the switch is in that direction, the groups are counted counter-clockwise.  If the cable is the field side, the count is clockwise. There are indicators on the mylar ribbons to know where to begin for each layer and a diagram for the different cable sizes should be readily available for reference.

Other color schemes are sometimes used for outdoor cables, particularly outside the U.S., but this color code is common for aerial and underground cables up to several thousand pairs in North America.  In the UK, the British Post Office (later BT) used this color code for what is now known loosely as CW1308 specification cables, referring to the Post Office's "Cable and Wire" specification No. 1308.

Extra pairs and colors 

When working on aerial cable splicing and installation, it is common to use a telephone lineman's set or "butt set" to communicate over long distances. To facilitate this, extra pairs of wires are embedded in cables using "major" colors for both wires (instead of the major/minor color combinations used for the rest). One extra pair (red-white) may be embedded into cables that are 6 to 75 pairs; two pairs (red-white and black-white) may be encapsulated in cables of 100 to 300 pairs; and three pairs (red-white, black-white, and yellow-white) may be included in cables of 400 to 900 pairs. These extra pairs are often referred to as "talk pairs", and are never used for subscriber service.

Optical cable 
One color code used for fiber-optic cables, TIA-598-C, starts with the same first ten colors, adding rose for 11 and aqua for 12.

See also 
 20-pair colour code (Australia)

References 

Color codes
Telephony equipment
Telecommunications equipment